Saiyyada Shadab Fatima is an Indian politician. She was elected as the Member of Uttar Pradesh Legislative Assembly from Ghazipur Sadar Constituency from year 2007 on symbol of Bahujan Samaj Party and again from Zahoorabad Constituency  from year 2012 over Samajwadi Party symbol.

References

Members of the Uttar Pradesh Legislative Assembly
Women in Uttar Pradesh politics
Living people
Year of birth missing (living people)
Politicians from Ghazipur
Samajwadi Party politicians
Pragatisheel Samajwadi Party (Lohiya) politicians
Samajwadi Party politicians from Uttar Pradesh